Laurys station, also known as Laurys station, was a Lehigh Valley Railroad station in Laurys Station, Pennsylvania. Both the station and locality drew their name from David Laury, a local notable who established a hotel on the site in 1832 and later served as postmaster.

Service began at Laurys in 1855 with the opening of the Lehigh Valley Railroad. As was common for that era, it used a locally-constructed building. The railroad added an engine house in 1859.

The railroad constructed a new brick passenger station building in 1884. It was designed by Walter Gilman Berg. It was a single-floor structure with, appropriately for a region, a slate roof. The building measured . It contained separate waiting rooms for men and women, including toilets for both; an agent's office; and a baggage room.

Passenger service to Laurys ended in May 1938; the station and freight house were town down the following September.

Notes

References

External links 
 

Former Lehigh Valley Railroad stations
Demolished railway stations in the United States
Railway stations in the United States opened in 1855
Railway stations closed in 1938
1855 establishments in Pennsylvania
1938 disestablishments in Pennsylvania